Óttarsson is a patronym. It may refer to:

Hallfreðr Óttarsson (ca. 965 - ca. 1007), also known as Hallfreðr vandræðaskáld (Troublesome Poet) Icelandic skald (poet)
Ásbjörn Óttarsson (born 1962), Icelandic politician
Guðlaugur Kristinn Óttarsson (born 1954), Icelandic guitar player, engineer, mathematician, inventor, lecturer